Sebastian Xavier (born 10 February 1970) is a former Indian swimmer from Kerala.

Career
He was the fastest swimmer of India for more than a decade. He held the national record of 22.89 seconds in 50 meters freestyle swimming for 11 years from 1998 to 2009  in addition to several other national records during his career. He represented India in the 1996 Olympic Games at Atlanta, in two Asian Games and in several South Asian Games (SAF) games. Sebastian won 36 gold medals at the SAF Games, SAF Championships and Asia Pacific meets and 66 gold medals in the national meets. He received the Arjuna Award in 2001.

Personal life
Sebastian is married to former Indian athlete Molly Chacko and the couple works with Southern Railways.

References

External links

Indian male swimmers
Indian male freestyle swimmers
Malayali people
Swimmers from Kerala
Recipients of the Arjuna Award
Swimmers at the 1996 Summer Olympics
Olympic swimmers of India
1970 births
Living people
People from Alappuzha district
Swimmers at the 1998 Asian Games
Asian Games competitors for India
South Asian Games gold medalists for India
South Asian Games medalists in swimming
20th-century Indian people
21st-century Indian people